Lead Mountain is a summit in Grand County, Colorado, in the United States. It is in the Rocky Mountain National Park.

Lead Mountain was named in 1879 on account of its lead deposits.

References

Mountains of Grand County, Colorado
Mountains of Colorado